Lepidozia reptans is a species of liverwort belonging to the family Lepidoziaceae.

It has cosmopolitan distribution.

References

Lepidoziaceae
Taxa named by Carl Linnaeus